Leung Chun Pong (born 1 October 1986 in Hong Kong) is a Hong Kong professional footballer who currently plays as a defensive midfielder for Hong Kong Premier League club Eastern.

Biography

Childhood
He was graduated from CCC Hoh Fok Tong College and PLK Fong Wong Kam Cheun Primary School (A.M.) in Tuen Mun.

Club career

South China

Leung Chun Pong scored a goal to help South China win 3:1 at home to VB Sports Club and advance to the second round of the 2010 AFC Cup. On 30 May 2012, Leung Chun Pong decided to leave South China and developed his career in mainland China.

Guangdong Sunray Cave

On 12 June 2012, Leung Chun Pong moved to mainland China and signed a contract with China League One side Guangdong Sunray Cave. He made his debut for Guangdong Sunray Cave on 23 June 2012, in a 2–0 away win against Beijing Baxy. On 30 June 2012, he scored his first goal in China League One in the match between Guangdong Sunray Cave and Shanghai East Asia F.C., where Guangdong Sunray Cave lost to Shanghai East Asia 1–2.

International career
Leung Chun Pong's lung was infested after playing a friendly against India in October 2010 and had to be hospitalised in an isolated ward. He recovered 2 days later and was released from hospital.

On 28 July 2011, Leung Chun Pong was sent off in the 0–5 defeat by Saudi Arabia in the 2014 FIFA World Cup qualification match. Leung Chun Pong is suspended for two games for this red card and will have to miss two games in the 2011 Long Teng Cup.

Career statistics

Club
As of 21 March 2020

International

Overview

Hong Kong U-23
As of 3 January 2010

Hong Kong
As of 16 November 2018

Honours

Club
Eastern
 Hong Kong Senior Shield: 2019–20
 Hong Kong FA Cup: 2019–20

International
East Asian Games: 2009

References

External links

1986 births
Living people
Hong Kong footballers
Hong Kong expatriate footballers
Hong Kong Rangers FC players
Association football midfielders
China League One players
Hong Kong First Division League players
Hong Kong Premier League players
Guangdong Sunray Cave players
Citizen AA players
Happy Valley AA players
South China AA players
Eastern Sports Club footballers
Hong Kong international footballers
Footballers at the 2006 Asian Games
Asian Games competitors for Hong Kong
Hong Kong League XI representative players